Gellért Hill Calvary was a Late Baroque calvary on Gellért Hill, Budapest which was demolished around 1950.

History

The first calvary on Gellért Hill was built in 1715 by a citizen of Buda on the initiative of the Jesuit Order. The simple structure was made up of two stone sculptures and a wood crucifix. In 1795 Füll (or Fühl) Mihály started a public fundraising to build a new group instead of the old one which was already decaying. The magistrate of Buda supported the effort but it took decades to realize. In 1822 the calvary was described as "recentius a Cive Michaele Fühl exstructa" (recently built by Fühl Mihály). The road to the new group was lined by stations whose paintings depicted the sufferings of Christ. On Easter Mondays a procession climbed the steep road leading to the calvary to celebrate the resurrection. Tents and vendors were erected on a nearby meadow. The emmausjárás (Emmaus-walk) or tojásbúcsú (egg feast) was one of the most popular Catholic holidays of the year during the 18-19th centuries. In 1873 the citizens of the Tabán district repaired a few stations and decorated them with new paintings, painted on wood by „C. Sauer”. Many stations were demolished in the 1920s. Only three of them were still standing in the 1930s. The last photo about the building was made in 1943. The calvary was demolished around 1950.

Description

The calvary stood in a very small, rectangular courtyard surrounded by brick walls. The front side was closed with a wooden gate between two brick pillars. The pillars were crowned with iron crosses standing on stone balls. The back wall was arched. The stone crucifix of the calvary was 3.5 m high and it was surrounded by three painted stone sculptures: Mary Magdalene kneeling, the Virgin Mary and  John the Apostle standing. There was wooden niche behind the calvary symbolizing the Holy Sepulchre with two wooden angels.

Notes

Sources
 Horler Miklós: Budapest műemlékei, 1962

Religious buildings and structures completed in 1715
Buildings and structures demolished in 1950
Buildings and structures in Budapest
1715 establishments in the Habsburg monarchy
18th-century establishments in Hungary
Demolished buildings and structures in Hungary